Eighteen ships of the Royal Navy have borne the name HMS Mercury, or HMS Mercure, after the God Mercury, of Roman mythology:
  was a 6-gun galley launched in 1592 and sold in 1611.
  was a ship launched in 1620.  Her fate is unknown.
  was a ship purchased in 1622.  Her fate is unknown.
  was a 6-gun advice boat launched in 1694 and captured by a French privateer in 1697.
  was an 8-gun fireship purchased in 1739 and foundered in 1744.
  was a 16-gun brigantine launched in 1744 and captured in 1745.
  was a 24-gun sixth rate launched in 1745 and broken up in 1753.
  was a 20-gun sixth rate launched in 1756 and wrecked in 1777.
  was an unrated schooner in service 1760–65.
  was a 28-gun sixth rate launched in 1779 and broken up in 1814.
  was an 18-gun sloop.  She was formerly a French privateer that  and  captured in 1798.  She was renamed HMS Trompeuse in 1799 and foundered in 1800.
  was a tender launched in 1807 and broken up in 1835.
  was a 46-gun fifth rate launched in 1826, used as a coal hulk from 1861 and sold in 1906.
  was a cutter tender launched in 1837, renamed YC6 in 1866, HMS Plymouth in 1876, and sold in 1904.
She was to have been named HMS Columbine in 1912, but this did not happen.
  was an auxiliary minesweeper sunk during World War I.
  was a paddle steamer requisition during World War II for use as an auxiliary minesweeper which struck a mine and sank in 1940.
  was a Royal Naval Communications/Signal School sited at Leydene House near Petersfield, Hampshire, in commission from 1941 until 1993.

See also
 , a 14-gun brig launched at Bombay Dockyard in 1806 for the naval arm of the British East India Company and lost at sea in 1833.
  or Mercury Packet, launched at Calcutta in 1806 and sold at Java in 1822.
 , a naval training establishment until 1968 at Hamble in Hampshire, founded as a ship in 1885.

References
 

Royal Navy ship names